Keelerville, Ontario can mean the following:

Keelerville, Frontenac County, Ontario
Keelerville, Stormont, Dundas and Glengarry United Counties, Ontario